The Ministry of Foreign Affairs, International Trade and Worship (MRECIC), informally referred to as the Chancellery, is the Argentine government ministry dealing with the foreign relations of Argentina, Argentina's foreign policy, international development, international trade, diaspora and matters dealing with Mercosur and the Catholic Church. 

The Ministry of Foreign Affairs is one of the oldest continuously existing portfolios in the Argentine government, having existed uninterruptedly since the formation of the first Argentine executive in 1854, in the presidency of Justo José de Urquiza. The incumbent minister is Santiago Cafiero, who has served since 20 September 2021 in the cabinet of Alberto Fernández.

Structure and dependencies
The Ministry's Department of Worship (Secretaría de Culto) has several directorates.  The Registry Directorate maintains the National Register of Religions, which compiles the mandatory registrations of all churches and religious communities, other than those of the Catholic Church.

The Directorate General for Catholic Worship (La Dirección General de Culto Católico), is the main liaison for the government of Argentina with the Catholic Church, by far the largest religious body in Argentina. It maintains relations with the archbishops, the bishop's conference and with the various monastic orders. The department also awards individuals and organizations that, through their work, have encouraged rich ecumenical and interreligious dialogue.

The ministry also oversees the Instituto del Servicio Exterior de la Nación, Argentina's primary diplomatic academy.

Headquarters
The Ministry of Foreign Affairs was originally headquartered in San Martín Palace, in the Retiro barrio of Buenos Aires. The palace, designed by architect Alejandro Christophersen and completed in 1905, originally belonged to the wealthy Anchorena family, and was bought by the Argentine government in 1936.

Since 1993, the Ministry's main offices have been housed in the informally named Edificio Cancillería, located across the street from San Martín Palace. The Palace remains in use as the ceremonial headquarters of the Ministry.

Ministers

See also
Foreign relations of Argentina
List of diplomatic missions of Argentina
List of diplomatic missions in Argentina

Notes and references

External links
 

Foreign Affairs and Worship
Foreign relations of Argentina
Argentina
Argentina
Argentina
1854 establishments in Argentina